Kotychi is a lagoon in the northwestern part of Elis, Greece. It straddles the boundaries of the municipal units Lechaina and Vouprasia. It is located 23 km north of Amaliada and 45 km southwest of Patras. The lagoon is connected with the Ionian Sea. It is a protected wetland area, as recognized by the Ramsar Convention, The Kotychi lagoon is an important areas for waterbirds in Greece. Its surface area is 3.7 km².

References

Landforms of Elis
Wetlands of Greece
Lagoons of Greece
Landforms of Western Greece
Ramsar sites in Greece